Schweigger is a German surname. Notable people with the surname include:

August Friedrich Schweigger (1783–1821), German naturalist
Franz Schweigger-Seidel (1834–1871), German physiologist
Franz Wilhelm Schweigger-Seidel (1795–1838), German physician and chemist
Johann Schweigger (1779–1857), German chemist, physicist, and professor of mathematics
Karl Ernst Theodor Schweigger (1830–1905), German ophthalmologist
Salomon Schweigger (1551–1622), German Lutheran theologian, minister, anthropologist and orientalist

See also
Schweigger-Seidel sheath, phagocytic sleeve, part of a sheathed arteriole of the spleen
Schwager (disambiguation)
Schwaiger
Schweiger

German-language surnames